Amanush is a 1975 Indian action drama film made in both Hindi and Bengali languages, produced and directed by Shakti Samanta.  The film stars Sharmila Tagore, Uttam Kumar, Utpal Dutt and Asit Sen. Both the versions were hits. The film was based on Shaktipada Rajguru novel Naya Basat which he written based on Sundarban. The film music composed by the popular Bengali singer-composer Shyamal Mitra.

The film’s plot line is simple enough, but it’s the complexity of human emotions depicted that makes it a classic. It is a flood that restores faith in boundless human spirit. Amanush that means half human, and half beast to marvel scope of the histrionic capabilities. The Bengali version of the film achieved immense popularity amongst Bengalis and featured many memorable songs by Kishore Kumar like Bipinbabur Karansudha and Ki Asha-y Baandhi Khelaghar. Also, this film featured the Bengali film star Uttam Kumar at the height of his popularity and Utpal Dutt turned in a typically stellar performance as the villain.

The film was later remade in Telugu as Edureeta (1977), starring N.T. Rama Rao, in Malayalam as Ithaa Oru Manushyan and in Tamil as Thyagam, with Sivaji Ganesan. After Amanush, Samanta once again made another double version, Anand Ashram (1977), with the same lead actors, however, that film didn't do well at the box office. The bengali version create record and become all time block buster and highest grossing bengali film ever at that time.

Plot

"Amanush" (made simultaneously in Bengali and Hindi) to marvel at the scope of the man's histrionic capabilities. Kumar shines as Madhusudan Roy Chaudhary, or Madhu, a straightforward scion of a zamindar family settled in a fishing village in the Sunderbans. He reflects angst and anger with understated ease after his life is ripped asunder by the machinations of the family munim, Maheem Ghosal. Reduced to a penniless drunkard, he is condemned to live the life of an amanush — half human, and half beast. As a debauched vagabond, he raises his voice on behalf of the downtrodden who suffer under the highhanded and corrupt Ghosal. This brings him face to face with the law enforcers, who are often hand in glove with the wily Ghosal.

It is in this backdrop that Inspector Bhuvan lands in the village, where Ghosal ‘fills his ears’ against Madhu. Bhuvan, without going into merits of the case, acts harshly on Madhu, even whipping him at the police station. However, he soon learns the story of Madhu and his estranged love interest, Rekha.

In a flashback, Madhu tells him how he was entrapped in a fake case of theft in his own house, whereon his ailing paternal uncle, under the influence of the munim, handed him over to the police. He is also accused of fathering a child through a prostitute. Before he can prove his innocence the woman is abducted and killed at the behest of Ghosal. On completing his prison sentence, Madhu returns to his village, only to find that his uncle has been murdered by the munim, who shows it as a case of natural death.

Thereon, Bhuvan embarks on a mission to reform Madhu and gets him a contract for building a dam in an adjoining village. A determined Madhu, with his two sidekicks, completes the job commendably. He even wins back the confidence of Rekha, whom he saves from drunken streamer operators one night. But the ice is finally broken when the village is endangered by raging flood waters that threaten to breach the dam. All villagers persuade Madhu to take the mantle of saving the village, but he spurns them, blaming them for his misery. Finally, on a visit by Rekha he relents, and saves the dam and the village from havoc.

His honour is restored, as is his love interest. Ghosal is arrested for his wrongdoings by Bhuvan, even as he is transferred to a new posting.

Cast

Uttam Kumar as Madhusudan Roy Chaudhary "Madhu"
Sharmila Tagore as Lekha
Prema Narayan as Dhanno
Anil Chatterjee as Police Inspector Bhuvan Roy
Utpal Dutt as Maheem Ghosal
Abhi Bhattacharya as Dr. Anand
Manmohan as Sanathan
Asit Sen as Pujari
Manik Dutt
Tarun Ghosh as Padha
Rajni Gupta
Subroto Mahapatra as Jyoti
Amol Sen as Constable
Probir Roy

Production
The film was based on Shaktipada Rajguru's novel Naya Basat which he written based on the people of Sundarban and there lifestyle.

This is the second hindi film of Uttam after Choti Si Mulaqat in 1967 which he produced himself. But that was failed to create any record and become disaster at the box office due to the bad direction and script. After that film he never worked any hindi film. Then later Shakti Samanta convince him to work.

Generally this film was shot in Sandeshkhali, Sundarbans. The name of the village where the shooting took place is Bhangatushkhali. The name of that village was shown in the film as Dhanekhali. For the purpose of shooting, about forty houses, zamindarbari, doctor's office, market, Radhagobindar temple, police station, school were built here. That Radhagobindar temple and the wooden bungalow where Uttam Kumar lived are still there. There is also that launch. Uttam Kumar would easily mingle with the people of the village during the shooting. He used to take children in his lap. He even helped people with money. That is why even today, on the day of his death on 24 July, a wreath is laid on his picture, which is a cultural event.

Shakti Samanta wanted to made this film in double version Hindi and Bengali for Kumar. Director Prabhat Roy (who also assistant director of this film) remained the shooting of this film. While shooting the song "Ki Ashay Bandhi Khelaghar" on the launch. They had lost the track in the deep jungle. Then Shakti Samanta saw a small light reflected from a grocer shop. When the shopkeeper came and saw Uttam Kumar he immediately ran away. Some moments later they see hundreds of people gathering in the bank of the river to see their guru Uttam Kumar.

Soundtrack

Music: Shyamal Mitra | Lyrics: Indeevar (Hindi) Gauriprasanna Majumder (Bengali)

Hindi

 "Dil Aisa Kisi Ne Mera Toda"		-	Kishore Kumar
 "Kal Ke Apne Na Jaane Kyun"		-	Kishore Kumar, Asha Bhosle
 "Tere Gaalonko Choomoon"		-	Kishore Kumar, Asha Bhosle
 "Ghum Ki Dawaa To Pyaar Hai"		-	Asha Bhosle
 "Na Puchho Koi Hamein"			-	Kishore Kumar
 "Nadiya Mein Lahre Naache" (title track) -	Shyamal Mitra

Bengali 
"Bipin Babur Karon Shudha" - Kishore Kumar
"Jani Na Aj Je Apon" - Asha Bhosle
"Jodi Hoi Chor Kata" - Kishore Kumar and Asha Bhosle
"Ki Ashay Badhi Khelaghor" - Kishore Kumar
"Na Na Omon Kore Daga Diye" - Asha Bhosle

Release
This was a double version film. Shoot stimulationaly hindi and bengali. The Bengali version was released in 1974 at Durga Puja. The Hindi version was released on 21 March 1975.

Reception
Uttam Kumar does a brilliant job of bringing out the angst and the anger of the character, while also making you empathise with him throughout. Sharmila Tagore’s Rekha is a strong woman, who is conflicted between her love for Madhu and the hurt of his betrayal. Utpal Dutt as the vicious villain is the one who shines throughout the film, and actually makes you forget that it is the same Utpal Dutt who was a master comedic actor.

The Bengali version create a record at Bengal box office and become golden jubilee hit. The Bengali version collected over ₹1.8 Crore. The film became highest grossing bengali film ever of that time. Hindi version become also success and become silver jubilee hit. But at the Bengaluru Swapna theater the film ran for 65 weeks. This was first and only successful Hindi film of Uttam Kumar's career.

Awards & nominations

Filmfare Award
1976: Filmfare Award for Best Film - Shakti Samanta (Nominated)
1976: Filmfare Award for Best Director - Shakti Samanta (Nominated)
1976: Filmfare Award for Best Actor - Uttam Kumar (Nominated)
1976: Filmfare Award for Best Supporting Actress - Prema Narayan (Nominated)
1976: Filmfare Award Best Male Playback Singer - Kishore Kumar for the song Dil Aisa Kisine Mera Toda
1976: Filmfare Award for Best Female Playback Singer - Asha Bhosle for the song Kal Ke Apne (Nominated)
1976: Filmfare Award Best Lyricist - Indevaar
1976: Filmfare Special Award - Uttam Kumar

Bengal Film Journalists' Association Award
1975: Bengal Film Journalists' Association - Best Actor Award - Uttam Kumar

Filmfare Awards East for Best Film - Amanush (1975)
Filmfare East Award for Best Actor - Uttam Kumar (1975)

Remakes 
For the popularity of this film this was remade in South India with N.T Ramarao in a Telugu remake called Edureeta in 1977; the Tamil remake was Thyagam with Sivaji Ganesan in 1978; the remake in Malayalam in 1978 was title Ithaa Oru Manushyan.

References

External links
 

1975 films
1970s Hindi-language films
Films directed by Shakti Samanta
Hindi films remade in other languages
Indian multilingual films
Hindi-language drama films
Bengali films remade in other languages
Bengali-language Indian films
1970s Bengali-language films
1975 multilingual films
Films scored by Shyamal Mitra
Films based on works by Shaktipada Rajguru